hawaiii is the fourth studio album from Canadian indie-rock band Said the Whale. It was released on September 17, 2013. The first two singles, "I Love You" and "Mother", were both featured on the I Love You EP.

The song "The Weight of the Season" was previously released on their 2009 Christmas EP.

Track listing

References

2013 albums
Said the Whale albums